Richard K. Lashof (November 9, 1922 – February 4, 2010) was an American mathematician. He contributed to the field of geometric and differential topology, working with Shiing-Shen Chern, Stephen Smale, among others. Lashof is regarded as "the key figure in sustaining the Chicago Mathematics Department as an international center for research and the training of topologists" by Melvin Rothenberg.

Born in Philadelphia, Pennsylvania, Lashof earned a Bachelor of Science degree in chemical engineering from the University of Pennsylvania in 1943, then served as a communications officer in the United States Navy from 1943 to 1946. He earned his doctoral degree in mathematics from Columbia University in 1954, under supervision of Richard Vincent Kadison. In 1971 he was an Invited Speaker at the International Congress of Mathematicians in Nice.

His wife, Joyce Lashof, was awarded the Sedgwick Memorial Medal in 1995.

References

External links

1922 births
2010 deaths
Mathematicians from Philadelphia
20th-century American mathematicians
21st-century American mathematicians
Topologists
University of Pennsylvania School of Engineering and Applied Science alumni
Columbia Graduate School of Arts and Sciences alumni
University of Chicago faculty
United States Navy personnel of World War II